RNU or rnu may stand for:

Republican Network for Unity, Northern Ireland
Russian National Union, Russia
Russian National Unity, Russia
Russian National Unity (2000), Russia. Organization after the split with the founder A. Barkashov.
RNU, Ranau Airport, Malaysia
Radiodifusión Nacional del Uruguay
rnu (Rowett nude), a hairlessness gene in laboratory rats

See also
RNU2, a human gene